Mariana in the South is an 1897 oil painting on canvas by the British Pre-Raphaelite artist John William Waterhouse.

Appraisal 
Mariana in the South is a major painting by Waterhouse, and depicts scenes from the 1830 Tennyson poem "Mariana in the South". Mariana prays for the return of the lost love, the dictator Angelo, who brutally spurned her on the loss of her dowry. The picture illustrates the line "And in the liquid mirror glowed the clear perfection of her face" from Tennyson's poem.

Provenance 
The painting measures . It is now in a private collection.

References

1897 paintings
Paintings by John William Waterhouse
Paintings based on works by William Shakespeare
Works based on Measure for Measure
Paintings based on works by Alfred, Lord Tennyson
Mirrors in art